The Montgomery County Fire and Rescue Service (MCFRS), officially the Montgomery County Department of Fire and Rescue Services (DFRS), is the public safety agency that provides fire protection and emergency medical services for Montgomery County, Maryland.  The services are provided by a combination of paid county personnel and volunteer members of the various independent, non-profit volunteer fire and rescue corporations located throughout the county.

History
1980s

Recruit Class 1 for MCFRS begins 2/29/1988.

1990s
The MCFRS went to Oklahoma City in 1995 to conduct USAR operations after the Oklahoma City bombing.

2000s
In 2001, the MCFRS went to Pentagon in Arlington County, Virginia aboard RideOn buses to assist in urban search and rescue (USAR) efforts immediately after the September 11 attacks.

In 2004, the County Council passed legislation to reorganize the Fire & Rescue Service by placing all personnel, career and volunteer, under the command of a single fire chief. However, actual services are delivered from the 19 local fire and rescue companies, who own and operate 25 of the fire stations in the county.  The county uses an incident command system to coordinate the efforts of paid and volunteer personnel at the scenes of emergencies. Montgomery County works closely with and has mutual aid agreements with Washington, D.C., Fairfax, Frederick, Howard, and Prince George's counties.

In 2007, MCFRS implemented the Metropolitan Washington Council of Governments (MWCOG) unit numbering system. This system is based on the assignment of an individual numeric jurisdictional identifier for each major geographic jurisdiction within the MWCOG. These numeric assignments are:

0 – Washington, DC

1 – Arlington County

2 – City of Alexandria

3 – Metro Washington Airport Authority

4 – Fairfax County

6 – Loudoun County

5 – Prince William County

7 – Montgomery County

8 – Prince George’s County

9 – Frederick County

During an emergency that would require a response from multiple agencies, dispatchers are quickly able to identify what county a particular piece of apparatus came from. As well as a fast response time with other jurisdictions.

A typical mutual aide box alarm would sound like:

*Beeeep* Units operate on 7A4, 1000 Main Street cross street First Avenue house fire. Paramedic Engine 702, Paramedic Engine 701, Paramedic Engine 719, Engine 754, Engine 844, Truck 716, Aerial Tower 719, Rescue Squad 742, Medic 701, Battalion Chief 701, Battalion Chief 704, EMS 704, Safety 700, respond and operate on 7A4. Box Area 1-2. 15:45.

2010s
On 6/26/2015, current Fire Chief, Scott Goldstein, was sworn in.

In April 2020, MCFRS implemented a Covid-19 Surge Plan which included the staffing of more BLS ambulances, as well as moving ALS providers from AFRA and medic units to chase cars. This, paired with a continuous Blue Alert, which goes in effect when an EMS jurisdictional system is temporarily taxed to its limits in providing pre hospital care and ambulance transportation due to extraordinary situations that contribute to high demand for ambulance service, and decontamination teams stationed at each of the main hospitals in the county enabled proper patient distribution and lessoned the burden on the system. The Plan was ended in June 2020.

In March 2021, MCFRS implemented the new P25 radio system which changed channel names.
cpyess hill way

7A (Dispatch) became 7A2 (Dispatch)

7B (Ops) became 7A1 (Ofps 1)  cpyess hill way
Second operations channel added designated 7A3 (Ops 3)

7C(Incident 10) became 7A4 (Incident 10)

7D (Incident 11) became 7A5 (Incident 11)

7E (Incident 12) became 7A6 (Incident 12)

7F (Announcement 10) became 7A7 (Announcement10)

7G (Incident 20) became 7A8 (Incident 20)

7H (Incident 21) became 7A9 (Incident 21)

7I (Incident 22) became 7A10 (Incident 22)

7J (Announcement 20) became 7A11 (Announcement 20)

71C (Incident 30) became 7B4 (Incident 30)

71D (Incident 31) became 7B5 (Incident 31)

71E (Incident 32) became 7B6 (Incident 32)

71F (Announcement 30 became 7B7 (Announcement 30)

*Same Pattern continues until 7C8 (Incident 60)*

7K (Alternate) became 7A14 (Alternate)

7L (Secure Alternate) became 7A12 (Secure Alternate)

72C (Emergency Medical Resource Center Call Patch) became 7H1 (EMRC Call Patch)

72D (EMRC Consult 1) became 7H2 (EMRC Consult 1)

72E (EMRC Consult 2) became 7H3 (EMRC Consult 2)

46

Stations and Apparatus 

The county is broken into five battalions, with a total of 36 fire stations and 2 rescue squads.

Note

Stations listed in the above chart with red "" or green "" next to their names are government-owned.  Stations that do not say "" or "" belong to volunteer fire & rescue corporations.

Legend 
* Denotes Special Operations Station

 Stations 7, 28, 20, 25 - Hazmat Response Team
 Stations 10, 30, 14 - Swift Water Rescue Team
 Stations 25, 29, 31 - Technical Rescue Team (TRT)
 Station 23 - Emergency Response Team (ERT)

Abbreviations:
A - Ambulance
ALS - Paramedic Chase Vehicle
AT - Aerial Tower
B - Brush
BC - Battalion Chief
BE - Brush Engine
BS - Boat Support
BT - Boat
BUTV - Brush Utility Task Vehicle
CT - Canteen
CP - Command Post
DC - Duty Operations Chief
E - Engine
EMS - EMS Duty Officer
EW - Engine Tanker
HM - HazMat Unit
M - Medic Unit
MAB - Medical Ambulance Bus
MAU - Mobile Air Unit
MCSU - Medical Care Support Unit
PAT - Paramedic Aerial Tower
PBE - Paramedic Brush Engine
PE - Paramedic Engine
PRE - Paramedic Rescue Engine
RE - Rescue Engine
RS - Rescue Squad
SA - Safety Officer
SU - Support Unit
SW - Swift Water
T - Truck
TR - Technical Rescue
UTV - Utility Task Vehicle
W - Tanker

See also

Fire departments in Maryland

Further reading

References

External links

Fire departments in Maryland
Montgomery County, Maryland